Terence Frederick Mitchell (3 May 1919 – 1 January 2007), commonly known as T. F. Mitchell, was a British linguist and Professor of Linguistics and Phonetics at the University of Leeds.

Biography
Mitchell was born in Devon and educated at Torquay Boys' Grammar School and University College London from which he graduated with a BA in French and Spanish in 1940.  He then served with the Royal Artillery of the British Army in India, Burma and the Middle East until discharged as a Major in 1946.

Academic career
Mitchell's first academic appointment in 1946 was at the School of Oriental and African Studies (SOAS) in London where he worked with Professor J R Firth.

Mitchell remained at SOAS until 1964 when he was appointed Professor of Contemporary English at the University of Leeds.  In 1966 his Chair was renamed English Language and General Linguistics.  From 1967 to 1970 he was Chairman of the School of English at Leeds.  In 1971 the University created a separate Department of Linguistics and Phonetics.  Mitchell became Professor and Head of the Department until 1980 when he retired with the title Emeritus Professor.

For fifteen years he was the editor of the periodical Archivum Linguisticum. Mitchell was also the author of Teach Yourself Colloquial Arabic subtitled "the living language of Egypt", first published in 1962.

References

External links
Obituary
British Army Officers 1939−1945

Linguists from the United Kingdom
1919 births
2007 deaths
Place of birth missing
People educated at Torquay Boys' Grammar School
Alumni of University College London
Academics of the University of Leeds
Academics of SOAS University of London
20th-century linguists
British Army personnel of World War II
Royal Artillery officers
Military personnel from Devon